TV Globo Internacional (also known by its acronym TVGI or just as Globo) is an international pay television channel broadcasting from Brazil. It was launched on 24 August 1999 and it is owned by Grupo Globo.

Programming
TV Globo Internacional offers more than four thousand hours of entertainment a day, including soap operas, series, miniseries, music festivals, humor programs, documentaries, news and live soccer. The channel signal is generated by Globo in Rio de Janeiro and São Paulo, and transmitted via satellite to the different international distributors. Access to the channel takes place through local cable or satellite operators. They are currently available in more than 105 countries on four continents: Africa, Americas, Asia and Oceania.

Globo Internacional's programming is similar to that of TV Globo in Brazil, but because it is an international channel, not all programming generated in Brazil can be displayed (due to international broadcasting rights). Switches are also made in the grid of programs for their subscribers in 115 countries in order to offer more variety. TVGI, in addition to the soap operas and miniseries produced by TV Globo in Brazil, also broadcasts TV news programs such as Hora Um da Notícia, Bom Dia Brasil, Jornal Hoje, Jornal Nacional and Jornal da Globo, live soccer, besides the 3 telenovelas currently exhibited in Brazil. The chapters will air the day after the transmission in Brazil, due to differences in time zone and editing. The same thing happens in relation to the series. In the case of Vale a Pena Ver de Novo, the telenovela transmitted to a certain region will not necessarily be the same one that will be appearing in Brazil. Serials such as A Diarista, Casseta & Planeta Urgente, Caldeirão do Huck, A Grande Família, Domingão do Faustão and Zorra Total, among others, are also broadcast by TVGI. The subscriber can follow the matches of the Brazilian Championship, Brazil Cup and some state championships. The TV Globo Internacional also broadcasts the Brazilian Carnival, national films, Spectacular Sports and shows.

It also broadcasts its own productions such as Planeta Brasil EUA, Planeta Brasil Japão, Cá Estamos, Conexões and America News, which brings the best of Brazilian communities abroad. In addition it also transmits GNT shows.

Correspondents

Journalism

Sports

Countries

Americas
In the Americas, in addition to the premium Globo Internacional channel, which is broadcast almost simultaneously with Brazilian programming and with original audio, the station has Pasiones from Hemisphere Media Group as the main partner in Latin America and the United States. Programming from the latter channel consists of soap operas from Globo dubbed in Spanish.

Europe
In November 2021, it was announced that TV Globo Internacional would stop broadcasting in all European countries, except Portugal, as of December 31. Viewers will follow Globo Internacional's programming through Globoplay.

See also
 Grupo Globo
 Globosat

References

Television networks in Brazil
Television channels and stations established in 1999
Portuguese-language television stations in Brazil
TV Globo
International broadcasters
Mass media in Rio de Janeiro (city)
Cable television in the United States
1999 establishments in Brazil